The Physical and Theoretical Chemistry Laboratory (PTCL) is a major chemistry laboratory at the University of Oxford, England. It is located in the main Science Area of the university on South Parks Road. Previously it was known as the Physical Chemistry Laboratory.

History
The original Physical Chemistry Laboratory was built in 1941 and at that time also housed the inorganic chemistry laboratory. It replaced the Balliol-Trinity Laboratories. The east wing of the building was completed in 1959 and inorganic chemistry, already in its own building on South Parks Road, then became a separate department in 1961. In 1972, the Department of Theoretical Chemistry was established in a house on South Parks Road, and in 1994, the amalgamation of the physical and theoretical chemistry departments took place. This was followed shortly by the theoretical group moving into the PTCL annexe in 1995.

The university is in the early planning stages of the demolition of the PTCL building, to be replaced by a second chemistry research laboratory.

Selected chemists
The following Oxford Physical and Theoretical chemists are of note:

 John Albery
 Peter Atkins
 Ronnie Bell
 E. J. Bowen
 Richard G. Compton
 Charles Coulson
 Frederick Dainton
 Cyril Hinshelwood
 Peter J. Hore
 Graham Richards
 Rex Richards
 Timothy Softley
 Robert K. Thomas
 Harold Thompson

See also
 Balliol-Trinity Laboratories, a forerunner of the PTCL
 Department of Chemistry, University of Oxford

References

External links
 Physical and Theoretical Chemistry Laboratory website
 Physical and Theoretical Chemistry: Research programmes at Oxford University
 Paintings at Physical and Theoretical Chemistry Laboratory, University of Oxford from the BBC

1941 establishments in England
Educational institutions established in 1941
Buildings and structures completed in 1941
Departments of the University of Oxford
Physical chemistry
Theoretical chemistry
University and college laboratories in the United Kingdom
Chemistry laboratories